Ijagbe is a village located in the Kogi State of Nigeria.

References

Populated places in Ondo State